The Second Army was a field army of the French Army during World War I and World War II. The Army became famous for fighting the Battle of Verdun in 1916 under Generals Philippe Pétain and Robert Nivelle.

Commanders

World War I 

 General de Curières de Castelnau (Mobilization – 21 June 1915)
 General Pétain (21 June 1915 – 1 May 1916)
 General Nivelle (1 May 1916 – 15 December 1916)
 General Guillaumat (15 December 1916 – 11 December 1917)
 General Auguste Edouard Hirschauer (11 December 1917 – 22 December 1918)
 General Antoine Baucheron de Boissoudy (22 December 1918 – 11 February 1919)

World War II 
 General Charles Huntziger (2 September 1939 – 5 June 1940)
 General Henry Freydenberg (5 June – 31 July 1940)

See also 
 List of French armies in WWI

Reference 

Field armies of France in World War I
02
Military units and formations of France in World War I
Military units and formations of France in World War II
Military units and formations established in 1914
1914 establishments in France